Güeros is a 2014 Mexican road comedy-drama film directed by Alonso Ruizpalacios. Set in Mexico City in 1999, the film tells the story of three restless teenagers searching for a folk-rocker during the Mexican capital's student strike. The film won five Ariel Awards, including Best Picture in 2015.

Plot
In the opening scene, a young mother takes her crying infant outside in a stroller, only to be hit by a water balloon dropped by Tomas from the rooftop of the apartment building. When Tomas' mother finds out, she decides to send him to stay with his older brother Sombra, a student in Mexico City, and Sombra's roommate Santos. After a bus ride, he arrives at his brother's home late at night. The apartment is dark without electricity. The following morning there is no breakfast. Tomas witnesses how he and his roommate can obtain electricity though the neighbor below them by communicating with a girl with Down Syndrome, who will give them an extension cord in return for a story.
Tomas reads the newspaper and discovers a small note about Epigmenio Cruz, a Mexican folk rock musician, hospitalized for liver problems. Tomas, who idolizes Cruz since his father first brought a cassette of his music, suggests they search for and visit him. They get into a protest march of students, the 1999 student protests in Mexico City, and enter a hospital where Cruz had been admitted. Then they cross Mexico City to a zoo where Cruz had been working. His colleague tells them he no longer works there. They eventually find him in a bar. After Tomas heaps praise on him, Cruz falls asleep.

Reception
On review aggregator Rotten Tomatoes, the film holds an approval rating of 92% based on 52 reviews, with an average rating of 7.54/10. The website's critics consensus reads: "A striking effort that synthesizes disparate influences with inventive flair, Güeros marks a bold step forward for modern Mexican cinema."

Awards
 Tribeca Film Festival, Best Cinematography
 Internationale Berliner Filmfestspiele, Best First Feature Film
 AFI, Special Jury Mention for Screenwriting

Cast 
 Tenoch Huerta Mejía - Sombra
 Sebastián Aguirre - Tomás
 Ilse Salas - Ana
 Leonardo Ortizgris - Santos

Awards and nominations

Ariel Awards
The Ariel Awards are awarded annually by the Mexican Academy of Film Arts and Sciences in Mexico. Güeros won five awards out of 12 nominations.

|-
|rowspan="12" scope="row"| 2015
|scope="row"| Güeros
|scope="row"| Best Picture
| 
|-
|rowspan="3" scope="row"| Alonso Ruizpalacios
|scope="row"| Best Director
| 
|-
|rowspan="1" scope="row"| Best First Feature Film
| 
|-
|rowspan="1" scope="row"| Best Original Screenplay
| 
|-
|scope="row"| Ilse Salas
|scope="row"| Best Actress
| 
|-
|scope="row"| Tenoch Huerta
|scope="row"| Best Actor
| 
|-
|scope="row"| Sebastián Aguirre
|rowspan="1" scope="row"| Breakthrough Male Performance
| 
|-
|scope="row"| Tomás Barreiro
|scope="row"| Best Score
| 
|-
|scope="row"| Isabel Muñoz, Pedro González, Gabriel Teyna, and Kyoshi Osawa
|rowspan="1" scope="row"| Best Sound
| 
|-
|scope="row"| Yibrán Asuad and Ana García
|rowspan="1" scope="row"| Best Film Editing
| 
|-
|scope="row"| Sandra Cabriada
|rowspan="1" scope="row"| Best Art Direction
| 
|-
|scope="row"| Damián García
|rowspan="1" scope="row"| Best Cinematography
| 
|-

Further reading
 Hannah Fielding Review: Güeros  Manchester Media Group, 1 December 2015 
 Godfrey Cheshire  Güeros Robert Ebert.com, May 20, 2015 
 Elise Nakhnikian Güeros Slant, April 16, 2014
 Andrew O'Hehir  Up all night in Mexico City: “Güeros,” a gorgeous, ecstatic slacker odyssey, is one of the best movies of the year The Salon.com, 21 May 2015  
  Kent Turner Film Festival 2014 Award Winners Tribeca Film Festival 2014 Award Winners Film-Forward.com, April 26, 2014 
Boyd van Hoeij Gueros: Berlin Review The Hollywood Reporter,  2/7/2014

External links

References

2014 films
Mexican comedy-drama films
2010s road comedy-drama films
2014 comedy-drama films
Best Picture Ariel Award winners
Films set in Mexico City